Yellow Tail (stylised [ yellow tail ]) is an Australian brand of wine produced by Casella Family Brands. Yellow Tail as well as Casella Family Brands as a whole are both based in Yenda, New South Wales.

History
In 1957 the Casella family, headed by Filippo Casella and his wife Maria, emigrated from Sicily to Australia for a better life.

Yellow Tail was developed for the Casella family winery to enter into the bottled wine market—having previously supplied bulk wine to other wineries. Yellow Tail was developed in 2000 and was originally marketed to export countries. It became the number one imported wine to the United States by 2011.

The namesake of the brand, Yellow Tail, is the yellow-footed rock wallaby (Petrogale xanthopus), a relative of kangaroos.

Vineyard 

Wines
Approximately a third of the grapes that are harvested by Yellow Tail are from their vineyard in Riverina, Australia. The rest are from other vineyards in South Eastern Australia. All Yellow Tail wines have their own specific label color. In addition to sparkling wines, Yellow Tail makes varietal wine from the following grape varieties: Moscato, Riesling, Semillon, Sauvignon blanc, Pinot gris, Chardonnay, Pinot noir, Merlot, Grenache, Shiraz and Cabernet Sauvignon in addition to some blended wine and Rosé. 
Each wine has different colours, for example Merlot is Orange, Shiraz is yellow, etc.

International sales 
In 2000, the Casellas joined with W.J. Deutsch & Sons, a family-owned marketing and distribution firm, in order to distribute Yellow Tail wines in the United States. In 2001, it sold 200,000 cases, a number that jumped to 2.2 million the next year.

Yellow Tail has enjoyed similar success in the UK which, in 2000, began importing more wine from Australia than from France for the first time in history. In 2005, Yellow Tail sold more wine in the US than all the French producers combined.

Fraud
Various local shops around Birmingham, England were found to be selling fraudulent Yellow Tail in 2021, following complaints by a presumably discerning buyer.

References 

 Bieler, Kristen Wolf, Wisconsin Beverage Guide (March, 2006). "Behind the [Yellow Tail] phenomenon: How it happened and what's next?"
 Kim, Chan W.; Mauborgne, Renee, Harvard Business School Press (2005). "Blue Ocean Strategy: How to Create Uncontested Market Space and Make the Competition Irrelevant", Boston Massachusetts, 28, 189, pp. 31–32

External links 
 

Australian brands
Australian wine
Wine brands
Riverina